Ferrari is an Italian sports car manufacturer.

Ferrari may also refer to:

People
 Ferrari (surname)
 Enzo Ferrari (1898–1988), founder of Italian automaker Ferrari S.p.A.
 Ettore Ferrari (1845-1929), Italian sculptor, politician and Grand Master of the Grande Oriente d'Italia
 Piero Ferrari, vice chairman of Italian automaker Ferrari S.p.A.
 Philipp von Ferrary (1850–1917), sometimes spelt Ferrari, philatelist who assembled one of the most complete stamp collections ever
 Ferraris (surname)

Arts, entertainment and media
 Ferrari (film), a 2003 film
 "Ferrari" (song), by James Hype and Miggy Dela Rosa
 "Ferrari", a song by Yemi Alade from the album Mama Africa
 "Ferrari", a song by Bebe Rexha from the album Expectations
 "Ferrari", a song by German-Kurdish rapper Eno featuring German-Turkish rapper Mero from Eno's 2019 album Fuchs
 Ferrari Grand Prix Challenge, also known as F-1 Hero MD, a 1992 Formula One racing video game for multiple console systems

Museums
Museo Casa Enzo Ferrari, Modena, Italy
 Museo Ferrari, museum of the automobile manufacturer

Other uses
 Autodromo Enzo e Dino Ferrari, auto racing circuit
 Enzo Ferrari (automobile), a sports car
 Ferrari Trento, Italian sparkling wine producers
 Ferrari World, amusement park
 LaFerrari, a Ferrari supercar
 Scuderia Ferrari, racing division of Ferrari S.p.A.

See also

Ferreira (disambiguation)
Ferretti (disambiguation)